Joe is a commercial Belgian radio station broadcasting in Dutch, and is mainly dedicated to pop music from the 1970s, 1980s, 1990s and 2000s. Since 2007 the radio station has been owned by DPG Media.

Joe mainly plays hit music from the 1980s to the present. According to the latest figures from the CIM, Joe achieved an average market share of 11% on a daily basis.

History
In 2001, Joe's predecessor 4fm was launched. Together with Q-music, it was the first commercial radio station to be licensed as a national broadcaster in the Flemish Community. The station was purchased by Talpa Media in 2005. In May 2007, 4fm was taken over by DPG Media - then known as the Vlaamse Media Maatschappij. In 2008, 4fm started broadcasting a news-focused breakfast show named 4fm actueel that was simulcast on   KANAALTWEE, owned by former Joe owner,  Medialaan. It was axed a few months later.

On 19 February 2009, the hosts of 4fm announced that the station would relaunch as Joe FM on 1 April 2009. The station's format largely stayed the same. On Saturdays and Sundays, a show called Joekes broadcast excerpts of standup sets and comedy skits. In August 2012, Joe FM changed its slogan to Your Greatest Hits and implemented several new programmes.

Frequencies
Joe broadcasts in the Flemish Community (Flanders and Brussels) on the following frequencies:
Aalst: 104.2 MHz
Antwerp: 103.4 MHz
Beringen: 98.4 MHz
Bree: 93.5 MHz
Brussegem: 95.6 MHz
Brussels: 103.4 MHz
Dendermonde: 92.2 MHz
Diest: 103.3 MHz
Egem: 104.1 MHz
Geel: 93.5 MHz
Genk: 103.4 MHz
Ghent: 92.8 MHz
Herzele: 90.9 MHz
Heusden-Zolder: 88.8 MHz
Holsbeek: 90.3 MHz
Kasterlee: 91.4 MHz
Leuven: 99.7 MHz
Lommel: 103.7 MHz
Mechelen: 96.7 MHz
Ninove: 99.7 MHz
Sint-Niklaas: 93.5 MHz
Sint-Pieters-Leeuw: 95.5 MHz
Sint-Truiden: 89.2 MHz
Temse: 93.5 MHz
Tongeren: 89.1 MHz
Turnhout: 90.6 MHz
Wuustwezel: 103.7 MHz
The station is also available via digital TV and online streams.

References

Dutch-language radio stations in Belgium
Radio stations established in 2001
Vilvoorde